Pimp-A-Lot stylized as Pimp-A-LOT is a Danish hip-hop/rap collective established in 2000 in Aarhus V, by the Danish rapper Abu Malek.

The Pimp-A-lot crew has included some of the most popular and famous artists on the Danish hip hop scene, notably rappers:

Johnson (full name Marc Johnson)
U$O (real name Ausamah Saed)
L.O.C. (real name Liam O'Connor)
Marwan (full name Mohamed Marwan)
Jøden (rapper) (real name Michael Christiansen)
Player'n
Cha D (real name Chadi Alderbas)
Angie

In 2003, the collective released the 23-track album I R Selv Ude Om D on In Tha House Records label.

References

External links
Facebook

Musical collectives
Danish rappers